Stanza 17-17 palazzo delle tasse, ufficio imposte (translation: "Room 17-17, income taxes palace, tax office") is a 1971 Italian heist comedy film  directed by Michele Lupo.

Plot 

Paduan architect Giambattista Manteghin, actor Romolo Moretti, Prince Pantegani and inventor Leonardo Rossi meet while trying to bribe a tax official out of paying exorbitant taxes. The four get together and conspire to rob the taxation office building, which happens to have been designed by Manteghin.

Cast 
 
 Gastone Moschin as  Giambattista Manteghin
 Philippe Leroy as  Romolo "Sartana" Moretti
 Lionel Stander as  Katanga
 Franco Fabrizi as  Prince Gondrano Pantegani del Cacco
 Raymond Bussières as  Leonardo Rossi
 Carlo Pisacane as  Colgate
 Ugo Tognazzi as  Ugo La Strizza
 Tano Cimarosa as Police Commissioner
  Joyce Geraldine Stewart as  Prostitute
 Ernesto Colli as  Parking Attendant
 John Karlsen as Strongbox Seller

References

External links

1970s crime comedy films
Italian heist films
Films directed by Michele Lupo
Films with screenplays by Sergio Donati
Films scored by Armando Trovajoli
Italian crime comedy films
1970s heist films
1970s Italian-language films
1971 films
1970s Italian films